Liisi Ojamaa (actually Katre-Liis Ojamaa; 26 February 1972 – 8 October 2019) was an Estonian poet, translator, literary critic and editor. She was already known for her debut collection "Endless July" (Estonian: "Lõputu juuli"), which was included in the collection "Poetry Cassette '90", Elo Vee (Elo Viiding), Triin Soomets, Ats (Aidi Vallik) and Ruth Jyrjo also made their debut on the tape.

Ojamaa translated over 60 books, mainly children's and science fiction, from English. Her poems have been featured by Toojalind, Lunatic Asylum, Anarch, Taak, The Tuberkuloited and HU?. She worked as a journalist for Õhtuleht, as a translator at the Estonian Law Translation Center and as an editor for the magazine Matrix .

Ojamaa was a member of the Estonian Writers' Union.

Personal life
Liisi Ojamaa's father was translator Jüri Ojamaa and mother was editor Maarja Ojamaa. Her paternal grandmother was Estonian civil servant and translator Lii Ojamaa. She had three daughters.

Bibliography
 Lõputu juuli. Tallinn: Eesti Raamat 1990. 77 S. (Kassett '90)
 Myyrid & wärawad. Tallinn: Perioodika 1993 48 S. (Loomingu Raamatukogu 13/1993)
 Lootus. Tallinn: Varrak 2000. 40 S.
 Ärasaatmata kirjad. Tallinn: Varrak 2002. 61 S.
 Jõgi asfaldi all. Tallinn: Varrak 2008. 52 S.
 Ajalaulud. Tallinn: Varrak 2011. 83 S.

Works 
 Piret Viires: Viis tüdrukut ja ei ühtegi poissi, in: Looming 2/1992, S. 277–279.
 Barbi Pilvre: Ja neid saatvad isikud, in: Vikerkaar 3/1992, S. 83–85.
 Marin Laak: Variatsioonid teemale «Kuidas yhiscond mind läbi pexis», in: Keel ja Kirjandus 3/1992, S. 179–182.
 Leelo Tungal: Juulikuu hestab, in: Looming 7/1993, S. 993–995.
 Eve Annuk: Feminismist, Orasest ja natuke ka Ojamaast, in: Vikerkaar 8/1993, S. 84–85.
 Hedda Maurer: Kui ka jumal ise keelaks, in: Looming 1/2001, S. 136–138.
 Martin Oja: Ärasaadetud kirjad, in: Looming 3/2003, S. 452–454.
 Kätlin Kaldmaa: Päikesetõus läbi mitme ilma, in: Looming 11/2008, S. 1742–1743.
 Andres Aule: 9. oktoobril 2019. Mõned hetked Liisi Ojamaaga, in: Lng 11/2019, S. 1598–1601.

References 

1972 births
2019 deaths
Writers from Tallinn
Estonian editors
Estonian women editors
Estonian magazine editors
Women magazine editors
Estonian women poets
Estonian translators
20th-century Estonian poets
21st-century Estonian poets
21st-century Estonian women writers
20th-century Estonian women writers
20th-century translators